Abralia spaercki is a species of enoploteuthid cephalopod that has been found in the waters off northern Australia, Indonesia and the Philippines. Its taxonomic relationship with A. multihamata still needs to be determined. It inhabits the mesopelagic zone of continental or island shelves.

References

Abralia
Molluscs described in 1931